Theodor Ivanovich Nette (born 1895 or 1896 – died February 5, 1926, Moscow-Riga train, Latvia) was a Soviet diplomatic courier of NKID, who died in a terrorist attack on the Soviet train while delivering diplomatic mail to Berlin. Vladimir Mayakovsky published a poem praising his death – "To Comrade Nette, the Man and the Ship" (1926) saying he wants to die like Nette.

Biography
Born in Latvia (possible version). Son of the shoemaker. Learned German. Joined the Social Democratic Party when he was 17. After World War I broke he and his father was arrested. Imprisoned at Riga Central, later transported to Petrograd Kresty Prison. Released in March 1917 and returned to Latvia. Official version says that he worked underground since August 1917 when German troops occupied Riga.

Since the beginning of 1918 worked in Petrograd as the secretary of the visa departament of RSFSR Narkomindel, later became a politcommissar of the second battalion of the 1st Red Latvian Riflemen regiment. After Soviet Latvia was declared in 1919 he was appointed as Chairman of the Jelgava revolutionary tribunal. Participated in the Civil War Southern Front. Since 1922 he became an official diplomatic courier of RSFSR Narkomindel.

On February 5, 1926 Moscow – Riga train was assaulted between the Ikšķile and Salaspils station. Armed men required the trainman to show courier's compartment and attacked the Soviet trade representative Pecherskiy. Nette and his partner Johann Mahmastal (1891—1942) took their guns but failed to close the door. Nette shot first and hits one attacker, but was instantly killed by a headshot. Mahmastal was wounded in the abdomen and right arm. Two attackers were also wounded and retreated (they were later found dead), while at least one could escape. Mahmastal stayed in the coupe and guarded the diplomatic cargo until Riga, where USSR Plenipotentiary Officers arrived.

Buried at Vagankovo.

Legacy
The attacks echoed wide around the USSR.
 A year after the tragic events Alexander Dovzhenko releases a film The Diplomatic Pouch (1927).
 Nette was posthumously awarded with the Order of the Red Banner together with his wounded colleague Iogann Mahmastal
 The steamship Tver was renamed in his honour (which in turn inspired the Mayakovsky's poem). Later his name was given to the two ships of the Soviet Northern Sea Steamship Line (Sovtorgflot) consequently – gas-turbine ship of 1963 and the timber ship of 1990 (Pavlin Vinogradov class was similar to the Iogann Mahmastal timber ship (currently, Northern Shipping Company). Currently, no ship bears his name.
 Nette's daughter, who was only 1-year old at time of father's death, was cared by State.
 February 5 became an official remembrance day of fallen diplomatic couriers.
 Odessa Film release a film in 1977 named Red Dipcouriers based on the story of the attack on Nette and Mahmastal.
 The man and the [steam]ship became a strong cliché in Russia after use by Eduard Uspensky's novel Winter in Prostokvashino and in subsequent animation film (in the form of Kruzenshtern, the man and the ship, 1984). In general, the expression refers to someone with 'gravitas'.

References

External links
 Vladimir Mayakovsky
  (1927)
  (1977)

1890s births
1926 deaths
Year of birth uncertain
Old Bolsheviks
Latvian Riflemen
Latvian Socialist Soviet Republic people
Soviet military personnel of the Russian Civil War
Terrorist incidents on railway systems
Terrorism victims
Assassinated diplomats of the Soviet Union
Inmates of Kresty Prison
Recipients of the Order of the Red Banner
Soviet people murdered abroad